Rey is a 2015 Indian Telugu-language romantic action dance film produced and directed by YVS Chowdary. The film stars Sai Dharam Tej, Saiyami Kher, Shraddha Das while Arpit Ranka and Farhad Shahnawaz play supporting roles. Chakri composed the music. 

The film was launched at Ramanaidu Studios in Hyderabad on 17 October 2010 on the eve of Vijayadasami, and ended on 6 August 2013. The film is released on 27 March 2015.

Plot 
Jenna (Shraddha Das) is a famous "Star" and Mexican pop singer who won two "Best of the World" titles in the competitions held at the epicenter of music United States. But to win it the third time she faces tough competition from Sandi (Farhad Shanawaz). A Mexican Mafia Don Dange (Arpit Ranka) who worships Jenna kills Sandi to eliminate the competition for her. Amrita (Saiyami Kher) from India, pledges to win the "Best of the World" title and joins a Jamaican College, Bob Marley to enter the competition. There she meets Rock (Sai Dharam Tej), who is a big flirt and never cares for any woman's feelings. He goes on flirting and using insults and abusive language with the girls. He annoys Amrita to the core. His life takes a sudden turn due to an incident, and he with his rock band decides to join Amrita in the competition. Jenna tries to create all sorts of troubles possible for the band very desperately. Why does Jenna need to stop Rock band? What is she afraid off? How will Rock answer her challenges and overcome them? Will Jenna win the third title or will Rock band create history?

Cast 

 Sai Dharam Tej as Rock, Gangster of Jamaica
 Saiyami Kher as Amrutha
 Shraddha Das as Jenna, Goddess of America
 Farhad Shahnawaz as Sandy
 Arpit Ranka as Dange, a don in USA
 Naresh as Rock's father
 Richie Stephens as The Reverend
 Ali as Lungi Baba
 Venu Madhav as Virus
 Jaya Prakash Reddy as Principal
 Brahmanandam
 Rao Ramesh
 Tanikella Bharani
 Noel Sean
 M. S. Narayana
 Raghu Babu
 Duvvasi Mohan
 Kota Srinivasa Rao
 Praveen
 Saptagiri

Soundtrack

The music composed by Chakri, with lyrics written by Chandrabose. The soundtrack album was released under the label Aditya Music on 3 December 2012. The soundtrack received a mixed review from Cinecorn.com, receiving a rating of 2/5, stating Director YVS Chowdhary for the maximum part hasn't disappointed musically despite the ‘been there, done that kind’ of feel it evokes but fails to deliver a knock out album. One feels the extra hard work being put for the album but it ends up hurting the album. Rey too is in similar vein and a lot depends on the choreography and placement of the songs in the film as well."

References

External links 
 

2010s Telugu-language films
2015 films
Films directed by Y. V. S. Chowdary
Indian romantic action films
Films scored by Chakri
Indian dance films